Bay Center is a census-designated place (CDP) in Pacific County, Washington, United States. The population was 174 at the 2000 census. The population increased to 276 at the 2010 census.

A post office called Bay Center has been in operation since 1876. The community was named for its central location on the harbor.

Geography
Bay Center is located at  (46.630051, -123.954630), near the mouth of the Palix River and Niawiakum River.

According to the United States Census Bureau, the CDP has a total area of 0.4 square miles (1.0 km2), all of it land.

Demographics
As of the census of 2000, there were 174 people, 70 households, and 42 families residing in the CDP. The population density was 443.7 people per square mile (172.3/km2). There were 92 housing units at an average density of 234.6/sq mi (91.1/km2). The racial makeup of the CDP was 68.39% White, 14.37% Native American, 0.57% Asian, 9.20% from other races, and 7.47% from two or more races. Hispanic or Latino of any race were 10.34% of the population. 10.7% were of English, 9.2% Irish and 6.9% American ancestry according to Census 2000.

There were 70 households, out of which 34.3% had children under the age of 18 living with them, 45.7% were married couples living together, 10.0% had a female householder with no husband present, and 38.6% were non-families. 34.3% of all households were made up of individuals, and 10.0% had someone living alone who was 65 years of age or older. The average household size was 2.49 and the average family size was 3.19.

In the CDP, the population was spread out, with 31.0% under the age of 18, 13.2% from 18 to 24, 22.4% from 25 to 44, 19.5% from 45 to 64, and 13.8% who were 65 years of age or older. The median age was 30 years. For every 100 females, there were 107.1 males. For every 100 females age 18 and over, there were 106.9 males.

The median income for a household in the CDP was $38,409, and the median income for a family was $42,656. Males had a median income of $33,125 versus $19,688 for females. The per capita income for the CDP was $19,325. About 10.9% of families and 13.4% of the population were below the poverty line, including 14.3% of those under the age of eighteen and 17.9% of those 65 or over.

Notable residents 
Lum You, convicted murderer
Colin Cowherd, television host

References

Census-designated places in Pacific County, Washington
Census-designated places in Washington (state)
Populated coastal places in Washington (state)